Kingsburg is a village in the province of Nova Scotia, Canada. The community is located approximately 130 kilometres from Halifax.

Kingsburg is also a protected cape.

History
King George III issued a land grant of approximately 1350 acres to foreign Protestant settlers, Leonard Hirtle, John Mossman, Peter Knack, Christian Hartman, John Kayser and Jacob Moser on July 5, 1787.

For decades, Kingsburg was a fishing and farming community. By the middle of the twentieth century, with the widespread decline of small-scale Atlantic fishery, most fishing culture had disappeared.

Economy
The evolution of Kingsburg into a vacation and retirement destination has had an impact on the population of the village. About 80% of the houses are vacant during most of the year.

Much of the rural infrastructure for Upper and Lower Kingsburg is centered in Riverport, Nova Scotia. This includes Riverport Electric, the first municipal utility incorporated in Nova Scotia, the Riverport & District Fire Department, Riverport & District Community Center, Riverport Community School and Riverport Post Office.

Geography

The Kingsburg Peninsula extends from Rose Bay, around the headlands of Rose Head, Hell Point and Gaff Point to the LaHave River estuary. The Greater Kingsburg Peninsula includes the defined area plus West Ironbound Island. Neighbouring areas to the Kingsburg Peninsula include Upper Kingsburg and Lower Rose Bay.

Gallery

References

External links
 Kingsburg Nova Scotia Community Association
 Kingsburg Coastal Conservancy

Communities in Lunenburg County, Nova Scotia
General Service Areas in Nova Scotia